Alexandra Dawn Wong (born April 19, 1982) is an American stand-up comedian and actress. She is best known for her Netflix stand-up specials Baby Cobra (2016), Hard Knock Wife (2018), and Don Wong (2022). She starred in the film Always Be My Maybe (2019), on which she also served as a writer and producer.

Wong was also a cast member on the ABC show American Housewife and has previously appeared on Inside Amy Schumer, Black Box, and Are You There, Chelsea? She was a writer for the first three seasons of the sitcom Fresh Off the Boat. She voices the title character Roberta "Bertie" Songthrush on the animated series Tuca & Bertie and Ali on the animated series Big Mouth. She was included in Times 100 Most Influential People of 2020.

Early life
Alexandra Dawn Wong was born in the Pacific Heights neighborhood of San Francisco, California, on April 19, 1982, the youngest of four children. Her Vietnamese mother, Tam "Tammy" Wong, relocated from Huế in 1960 to work as a social worker in the U.S. Her Chinese-American father, Adolphus Wong (1937–2011), was an anesthesiologist who worked for Kaiser Permanente for 30 years.

In 2000, Wong graduated from San Francisco University High School, where she was student body class president. She enrolled at UCLA, where she majored in Asian-American studies and discovered her love of performing as a member of the university's LCC ("Lapu, the Coyote that Cares") Theatre Company, the country's largest and oldest Asian-American collegiate theater company. She spent a summer working at The Lair of the Golden Bear, a UC Berkeley alumni summer family camp.  During her junior year she spent time in Hanoi. She graduated summa cum laude with a BA in Asian-American studies in 2005. After college, she studied in Vietnam through a Fulbright program.

Career

After graduating from college, Wong first tried stand-up comedy at the age of 23. She soon moved to New York City to pursue comedy, and began to perform up to nine times a night.

In 2011, Variety named her one of the "10 Comics to Watch". Soon after, she appeared on The Tonight Show, John Oliver's New York Stand Up Show and Dave Attell's Comedy Underground Show. She was also cast as series regular in the NBC comedy series Are You There, Chelsea? and appeared on Chelsea Lately. After that, she was in VH1's Best Week Ever and MTV's Hey Girl in 2013. Additionally, she starred in Oliver Stone's Savages, opposite Benicio Del Toro and Salma Hayek, and as Kate in the film Dealin' with Idiots.

In 2014, Wong played Dr. Lina Lark in the ABC medical drama series Black Box, opposite Kelly Reilly and Vanessa Redgrave. Since then, she has guest-starred in several episodes of Inside Amy Schumer. Wong has been a writer on Fresh Off the Boat since 2014. Randall Park, who is on the main cast, had suggested Wong for the writing role.

On Mother's Day 2016, Netflix released a stand-up special called Baby Cobra; the special was filmed in September 2015, when Wong was seven months pregnant with her first child at the Neptune Theater in Seattle. According to New York Magazine, "The special's arrival on Netflix is the sort of star-making moment that unites the tastes of the unlikeliest fans." 

On September 11, 2016, Wong spoke at, and walked the runway during New York Fashion Week for Opening Ceremony's show. In October 2016, Wong began starring in the ABC sitcom American Housewife. 

On May 13, 2018, Wong's second Netflix special, Hard Knock Wife, was released. It was filmed in late September 2017 at the Winter Garden Theatre in Toronto when she was seven months pregnant with her second child. In 2018, she voiced the character Citrus Twisty, a soda genie, in an episode of OK K.O.! Let's Be Heroes.

Wong starred with Randall Park in the 2019 Netflix film Always Be My Maybe, a film directed by Nahnatchka Khan, and written by Wong, Park, and Michael Golamco. From 2019 to 2022, Wong voiced Bertie in the Netflix animated sitcom Tuca & Bertie.

On October 15, 2019, Wong published a book entitled Dear Girls: Intimate Tales, Untold Secrets and Advice for Living Your Best Life. She described it as a life guide for her daughters to read when they reach adulthood. The book won the 2019 Goodreads Choice Award for Humor.

In February 2022, Wong released her third Netflix stand-up special, Don Wong.

Personal life
Wong met entrepreneur Justin Hakuta, the son of inventor Ken Hakuta, at the wedding of their mutual friends in 2010. They married in 2014. They have two daughters. 

Wong has been open about miscarrying twins prior to becoming pregnant with her first daughter, and has said that making jokes about her miscarriage has helped her cope.

In April 2022, Wong and Hakuta announced they had filed for divorce.

Filmography

As actress

As herself

Further reading 
 (2016) – Interview with Wong on Fresh Air with Terry Gross
 (2019) – Excerpts from her book Dear Girls

References

External links

 Ali Wong
 

1982 births
21st-century American actresses
21st-century American comedians
Actresses from San Francisco
Actresses of Vietnamese descent
American actresses of Chinese descent
American film actresses
American stand-up comedians
American television actresses
American television writers
American women comedians
American writers of Chinese descent
American writers of Vietnamese descent
Comedians from California
Living people
University of California, Los Angeles alumni
Writers from San Francisco
American women television writers
Screenwriters from California
21st-century American screenwriters
American comedians of Asian descent